Pseudocyon (False dog) is a genus of bear dog which inhabited Eurasia and North America during the Miocene epoch living approximately .

Pseudocyon was assigned to Amphicyoninae by Hunt in 1988 and to Amphicyonidae by Lartet (1851), Carroll (1988) and Pickford et al. in 2000.

Fossil distribution
Specimens were located in Belomechetskaia Russian Federation, Santa Cruz, New Mexico, Pontigne and Malartic, a la ferme Larrieu, France, and Nebraska. The largest fossil find was of a mandible (F:AM 49247) founded in New Mexico. The mass estimate derived from the mandible was about 773 kg, representing a very large individual of Pseudocyon.

Sources

Prehistoric mammals of North America
Bear dogs
Miocene carnivorans
Prehistoric carnivoran genera